Walerian Maryański (2 January 1875 – 6 May 1946) was a Polish sports shooter. He competed in the 25 m rapid fire pistol event at the 1924 Summer Olympics.

References

External links
 

1875 births
1946 deaths
People from Lviv Oblast
People from the Kingdom of Galicia and Lodomeria
Polish male sport shooters
Olympic shooters of Poland
Shooters at the 1924 Summer Olympics
Polish people of the Polish–Soviet War
Polish people of the Polish–Ukrainian War